Same Time, Next Year is a 1978 American romantic comedy-drama film directed by Robert Mulligan. The screenplay by Bernard Slade is based on his 1975 play of the same title. The film stars Alan Alda and Ellen Burstyn (the latter reprising her Broadway role).

Plot synopsis
In 1951, at an inn on the Mendocino County coast, Doris (Ellen Burstyn), a 24-year-old housewife from Oakland, meets George (Alan Alda), a 27-year-old accountant from New Jersey at dinner. They have a sexual tryst, and despite the fact that both are happily married with six children between them, begin to meet every year at the same hotel for one night together.

The film jumps forward five years at a time, episodically chronicling their time together, the changes each goes through, their respective marriages, and their deepening connection. In 1966, for example, George, now middle-aged and dressed in a suit, is shocked when Doris arrives in denim and wearing her hair to her waist, having enrolled in UC Berkeley and become ardently leftwing. George, meanwhile, reveals his newfound conservatism as a result of his son's having been killed in Vietnam the previous year.

At their meeting in 1977, George tells Doris that his wife, Helen, died unexpectedly earlier in the year, and that Helen revealed to a friend that she had known of the affair for ten years, but never told George she knew. Now a widower, George proposes to Doris, who refuses to accept because of her loyalty to, and respect for, her husband. Dejected, George leaves, but quickly returns, and they promise to continue the affair as long as they are able.

Production
The film is structured as six episodes, each occurring approximately five years apart. Between the scenes are shown a series of photos that depict cultural and political events that had ensued in the years between each segment, such as Harry S. Truman, Nikita Khrushchev, Lucille Ball, Elvis Presley, and John F. Kennedy. The episodes are period-specific, often making references to what was actually happening during the time portrayed. For example, in the segment set in 1966, Doris is caught up in the protest movement at Berkeley, while George takes a Librium and reveals that he had voted for Barry Goldwater, and later that his son had been killed in Vietnam.

The shell of the cottage was built on a temporary foundation overlooking the Pacific Ocean, but the interior was filmed on the Universal Studios sound stage in Los Angeles. After filming was completed, Universal paid for the shell to be relocated to a permanent foundation and the interior was outfitted with the studio furnishings. The cottage became a popular romantic getaway, so popular that the Heritage House eventually partitioned the cottage in half and added a second bathroom to the opposite end. One half of the cottage was called "Same Time" and the other half called "Next Year". The Heritage House closed due to foreclosure in December 2008. The cottage still stands, updated and remodeled, and the Heritage House reopened in the summer of 2013.

Theme song
Paul McCartney had composed a title song for the film, which he recorded with Wings, that was not used. He later released it as the B-side of a single in 1990. The theme song ultimately used was "The Last Time I Felt Like This," written by Marvin Hamlisch and Alan and Marilyn Bergman (eventually nominated for the Academy Award for Best Original Song) and performed by Johnny Mathis and Jane Olivor.

Critical reception
While Bernard Slade's acclaimed stage play earned a storm of praise, the film received mixed reviews. Janet Maslin of the New York Times wrote, "Mr. Slade's screenplay isn't often funny, and it's full of momentous events that can't be laughed away... As directed by Robert Mulligan... Same Time, Next Year is both less and more than it could have been. By moving the action outdoors once in a while, or into the inn's restaurant, Mr. Mulligan loses the element of claustrophobia that might have taken an audience's mind off the screenplay's troubles. But he substitutes the serenity of a California coastal setting, and gives the film a visual glamour that is mercifully distracting. Mr. Mulligan seems to have been more interested in sprucing up the material than in preserving its absolute integrity, and under the circumstances, his approach makes sense... Mr. Alda isn't terribly playful, and he reads every line as if it were part of a joke, which only accentuates the flatness of the script. Miss Burstyn, on the other hand... brings so much sweetness to Doris's various incarnations that the character very nearly comes to life." On Rotten Tomatoes, the film has an aggregate score of 40% based on 2 positive and 3 negative critic reviews.

Variety called the film "a textbook example of how to successfully transport a stage play to the big screen" and added, "The production of Bernard Slade's play, sensitively directed by Robert Mulligan, is everything you'd want from this kind of film. And it features two first class performances by Ellen Burstyn and Alan Alda."

Awards and nominations

The film is recognized by American Film Institute in these lists:
 2002: AFI's 100 Years...100 Passions – nominated

See also
Avanti! -  1972 comedy film by Billy Wilder with the similar idea of married lovers meeting secretly once a year in an hotel in Italy, and later their children.
One Day - Film with similar plot form, two characters meeting over the course of many years.

Notes

References

External links

1978 films
American romantic comedy-drama films
1970s romantic comedy-drama films
Films scored by Marvin Hamlisch
American films based on plays
Films directed by Robert Mulligan
Films featuring a Best Musical or Comedy Actress Golden Globe winning performance
Films produced by Walter Mirisch
Films set in California
Films shot in Los Angeles
Films set in hotels
Two-handers
Universal Pictures films
Films about adultery in the United States
Films set in 1951
Films set in 1956
Films set in 1961
Films set in 1966
Films set in 1972
Films set in 1977
1978 comedy films
1978 drama films
1970s English-language films
1970s American films
Films set in the 1950s
Films set in the 1960s
Films set in the 1970s